Slovakia competed at the 2016 Summer Olympics in Rio de Janeiro, Brazil, from 5 to 21 August 2016. This was the nation's sixth consecutive appearance at the Summer Olympics after gaining its independence from the former Czechoslovakia.

The Slovak Olympic Committee fielded a team of 51 athletes, 32 men and 19 women, across 12 sports at the Games. Although its full roster was larger by four athletes than in London 2012, this was still one of Slovakia's smallest delegations sent to the Summer Olympics. Slovakia made its Olympic debut in archery, as well as its return to synchronized swimming and table tennis after nearly a decade.

The Slovak team featured 17 returning Olympians, including skeet shooter Danka Barteková, who won the bronze in London four years earlier, 2015 world champion Matej Tóth, who entered his fourth consecutive Games as a top medal favorite in the 50 km race walk, and sprint kayaker and two-time medalist Erik Vlček, who joined the slalom canoe legend Michal Martikán as the only Slovaks participating in five Olympics. The only medalist returning from the previous Games to compete in Rio de Janeiro, Barteková was nominated by the committee to carry the Slovak flag at the opening ceremony. Other notable Slovak athletes included pro mountain biker Peter Sagan, twins Dana and Jana Velďáková in both long and triple jump, slalom canoe duo and cousins Ladislav and Peter Škantár, and world-ranked triathlete Richard Varga.

Slovakia left Rio de Janeiro with four medals (two gold and two silver), matching its overall tally from the 2012 Summer Olympics in London. Among the medalists were Tóth, who walked away with Slovakia's first ever track and field gold in his event, and the Škantár cousins, who succeeded the Hochschorner twins Pavol and Peter to win the Olympic title in the slalom canoe double.

Medalists

| width=78% align=left valign=top |

| width=22% align=left valign=top |

Competitors

| width=78% align=left valign=top |
The following is the list of number of competitors participating in the Games:

| width=22% align=left valign=top |

Archery

One Slovak archer has qualified for the women's individual recurve at the Olympics by securing one of three available Olympic spots at the 2016 European Championships in Nottingham, Great Britain, signifying the nation's Olympic debut in the sport. Meanwhile, another Slovak archer was added to the squad by virtue of a top five national finish in the men's individual recurve at the 2016 Archery World Cup meet in Antalya, Turkey.

Athletics
 
Slovak athletes have so far achieved qualifying standards in the following athletics events (up to a maximum of 3 athletes in each event):

Track & road events
Men

Women

Field events

Canoeing

Slalom
Slovak canoeists have qualified a maximum of one boat in each of the following classes through the 2015 ICF Canoe Slalom World Championships. Matej Beňuš became the first canoeist to be named to the Slovak team based on his performance at two ICF World Cup meets each in La Seu d'Urgell and Pau, and at the World Championships in London. Meanwhile, the remaining canoeists (Grigar, Dukátová, and Škantár cousins) rounded out the internal selection at the 2016 European Championships in Liptovský Mikuláš.

Sprint
Slovak canoeists have qualified three boats in each of the following distances for the Games through the 2015 ICF Canoe Sprint World Championships. Meanwhile, two additional boats (women's K-1 200 & 500 m) were awarded to the Slovak squad by virtue of a top two national finish at the 2016 European Qualification Regatta in Duisburg, Germany. 

Men

Women

Qualification Legend: FA = Qualify to final (medal); FB = Qualify to final B (non-medal)

Cycling

Road
Slovakia has qualified one rider in the men's Olympic road race by virtue of his best ranking among the top 100 individuals in the 2015 UCI World Tour.

Mountain biking
Slovakia has qualified one mountain biker for the men's Olympic cross-country race, as a result of his nation's fifteenth-place finish in the UCI Olympic Ranking List of May 25, 2016.

Gymnastics

Artistic
Slovakia has entered one artistic gymnast into the Olympic competition. Barbora Mokošová had claimed her Olympic spot in the women's apparatus and all-around events at the Olympic Test Event in Rio de Janeiro.

Women

Shooting
 
Slovak shooters have achieved quota places for the following events by virtue of their best finishes at the 2014 and 2015 ISSF World Championships, the 2015 ISSF World Cup series, and European Championships or Games, as long as they obtained a minimum qualifying score (MQS) by March 31, 2016.

Qualification Legend: Q = Qualify for the next round; q = Qualify for the bronze medal (shotgun)

Swimming

Slovak swimmers have so far achieved qualifying standards in the following events (up to a maximum of 2 swimmers in each event at the Olympic Qualifying Time (OQT), and potentially 1 at the Olympic Selection Time (OST)):

Synchronized swimming

Slovakia has fielded a squad of two synchronized swimmers to compete only in the women's duet by picking up one of four spare berths freed by the continental selection for being the next highest ranking nation at the FINA Olympic test event in Rio de Janeiro, signifying their nation's Olympic comeback to the sport since 2004.

Table tennis

Slovakia has entered three athletes into the table tennis competition at the Games, signifying the nation's Olympic return to the sport after an eight-year hiatus. Chinese-born Wang Yang and Barbora Balážová were automatically selected among the top 22 eligible players each in their respective singles events based on the ITTF Olympic Rankings. Meanwhile, Beijing 2008 Olympian Eva Ódorová granted an invitation from ITTF to compete in the women's singles as one of the next seven highest-ranked eligible players, not yet qualified, on the Olympic Ranking List.

Tennis

Slovakia has entered three tennis players into the Olympic tournament. Martin Kližan (world no. 51), Dominika Cibulková (world no. 21), and Anna Karolína Schmiedlová (world no. 40) qualified directly among the top 56 eligible players for their respective singles events based on the ATP and WTA World Rankings as of June 6, 2016. Having been directly entered to the singles, Kližan also opted to play with his rookie partner Andrej Martin in the men's doubles.

On July 27, 2016, Kližan pulled out from the Games due to his concerns about the Zika virus. Thereby, Martin replaced him in the men's singles and was subsequently set to play with Igor Zelenay in the men's doubles. Almost a week later, Cibulková withdrew from the Games due to a heel injury, leaving Schmiedlová as the lone female competitor.

Triathlon
 
Slovakia has entered one triathlete to compete at the Games. London 2012 Olympian Richard Varga was ranked among the top 40 eligible triathletes in the men's event based on the ITU Olympic Qualification List as of May 15, 2016.

Weightlifting

Slovakia has qualified one male weightlifter for the Rio Olympics by virtue of a top seven national finish at the 2016 European Championships. The team must allocate this place by June 20, 2016.

See also
Slovakia at the 2016 Summer Paralympics

References

External links 

 

Olympics
Nations at the 2016 Summer Olympics
2016